List of television broadcasters of the Little Caesars Pizza Bowl, which was known as the Motor City Bowl prior to 2009.

TV Broadcasters

Radio Broadcasters

References

External links
Bowls: Little Caesars Bowl Fails to Deliver

Little Caesars
Broadcasters
Little Caesars